In mathematics, the  four-spiral semigroup is a special semigroup generated by four idempotent elements. This special semigroup was first studied by Karl Byleen in a doctoral dissertation submitted to the University of Nebraska in 1977. It has several interesting properties: it is one of the most important examples of bi-simple but not completely-simple semigroups; it is also an important example of a fundamental regular semigroup; it is an indispensable building block of bisimple, idempotent-generated regular semigroups. A certain semigroup, called double four-spiral semigroup, generated by five idempotent elements has also been studied along with the four-spiral semigroup.

Definition
The four-spiral semigroup, denoted by Sp4, is the free semigroup generated by four elements  a, b, c, and d  satisfying the following eleven conditions:

 a2 = a, b2 = b, c2 = c, d2 = d.
 ab = b, ba = a, bc = b, cb = c, cd = d, dc = c.
 da = d.

The first set of conditions imply that the elements a, b, c, d are idempotents. The second set of conditions imply that a R b L c R d where R and L are the Green's relations in a semigroup. The lone condition in the third set can be written as d ωl a, where  ωl  is a biorder relation defined by Nambooripad. The diagram below summarises the various relations among a, b, c, d:

Elements of the four-spiral semigroup

General elements 
Every element of Sp4 can be written uniquely in one of the following forms:

 [c] (ac)m [a]
 [d] (bd)n [b]
 [c] (ac)m ad (bd)n [b]
where m and n are non-negative integers and terms in square brackets may be omitted as long as the remaining product is not empty. The forms of these elements imply that Sp4 has a partition Sp4 = A ∪ B ∪ C ∪ D ∪ E where
 A = { a(ca)n,  (bd)n+1,     a(ca)md(bd)n   :  m, n non-negative  integers }
 B = { (ac)n+1,  b(db)n,    a(ca)m(db) n+1  :    m, n non-negative integers }
 C = {  c(ac)m,     (db)n+1,    (ca)m+1(db)n+1 :   m, n non-negative integers }
 D = {  d(bd)n,   (ca)m+1(db)n+1d    :    m, n non-negative integers }
 E = {  (ca)m   :    m positive integer }

The sets A, B, C, D are bicyclic semigroups, E is an  infinite cyclic semigroup and the subsemigroup D ∪ E is a nonregular semigroup.

Idempotent elements 
The set of idempotents of Sp4,  is {an, bn, cn, dn :  n = 0, 1, 2, ...} where, a0 = a, b0 = b, c0 = c, d0 = d, and for  n = 0, 1, 2, ...., 
 an+1 = a(ca)n(db)nd
 bn+1 = a(ca)n(db)n+1 
 cn+1 = (ca)n+1(db)n+1
 dn+1 = (ca)n+1(db)n+ld

The sets of idempotents in the subsemigroups A, B, C, D (there are no idempotents in the subsemigoup E) are respectively:

 EA = { an : n = 0,1,2, ... }
 EB = { bn : n = 0,1,2, ... }
 EC = { cn : n = 0,1,2, ... }
 ED = { dn : n = 0,1,2, ... }

Four-spiral semigroup as a Rees-matrix semigroup

Let S be the set of all quadruples  (r, x, y, s) where r, s, ∈ { 0, 1 } and x and y are nonnegative integers and define a binary operation in S by

The set S with this operation is a Rees matrix semigroup over the bicyclic semigroup, and the four-spiral semigroup Sp4 is isomorphic to S.

Properties
By definition itself, the four-spiral semigroup is an idempotent generated semigroup (Sp4 is generated by the four idempotents a, b. c, d.)
The four-spiral semigroup is a fundamental semigroup, that is,  the only congruence on Sp4 which is contained in the Green's relation H in Sp4 is the equality relation.

Double four-spiral semigroup

The fundamental double four-spiral semigroup, denoted by  DSp4, is the semigroup generated by five elements a, b, c, d, e satisfying the following conditions:

a2 = a, b2 = b, c2 = c, d2 = d, e2 = e 
ab = b, ba = a, bc = b, cb = c, cd = d, dc = c, de = d, ed = e
ae = e, ea = e

The first set of conditions imply that the elements a, b, c, d, e are idempotents. The second set of conditions state  the Green's relations among these idempotents, namely, a R b L c R d L e. The two conditions in the third set imply that e ω a where ω is the biorder relation defined as ω = ωl ∩ ωr.

References

Semigroup theory